Cédric Jimenez (born 26 June 1976) is a French film producer, film director and screenwriter.

Career
Jimenez's 2014 film The Connection (La French), starring Academy Award winner Jean Dujardin, premiered at the Toronto International Film Festival.

In 2015, he directed an adaptation of Laurent Binet's prize-winning novel HHhH, starring Jason Clarke, Rosamund Pike, Mia Wasikowska, Jack O'Connell and Jack Reynor. The film was released the following year.

Filmography

References

External links

1976 births
Living people
French people of Spanish descent
French film producers
French film directors
French male screenwriters
French screenwriters
Mass media people from Marseille